Grapholita molesta, the oriental fruit moth or peach moth, is a moth of the family Tortricidae. It is native to China, but was introduced to Japan and North America and is now also found throughout of Europe, Asia  and South America and in  Hawaii, Morocco, Mauritius, South Africa, Australia and New Zealand

The wingspan is about 13 mm. Adults are gray with brown markings. There are four to seven generations per year.

The larvae feed on peach, apple, quince, pear, plum, cherry, apricot and nectarine. They are pinkish to creamy-white with brown heads and about 13 mm long. Early in the season, larvae tunnel in tender twigs causing twig die-back. Heavy infestations may give the tree a bushy appearance. Later generations may feed on terminal growth and developing peaches. Larvae attacking the fruit often enter near or through the stem and bore directly into the interior of the fruit. Larger peaches may show no external damage. Fruit damage may cause an increase in the amount of brown rot.

References

External links
species info at Bugwood
species info

Grapholitini
Moths described in 1916
Cosmopolitan moths